Hammond Gateway is a planned rail station on the South Shore Line in Hammond, Indiana. Intended to serve as the interchange point to the West Lake Corridor, it is expected to open to revenue service in 2025. The City of Hammond's financial contribution to the West Lake Corridor project was dependent on construction of this station. In 2017, the NICTD began demolition of houses between Hanover and Brunswick streets to begin construction.

Layout and services
Gateway Station features three tracks – two for the original South Shore Line and one for West Lake Corridor services. An island platform between the rerouted main line tracks will serve as replacement for the old Hammond station, and will be connected via pedestrian walkway to a side platform along the single elevated West Lake Corridor track.

West Lake Corridor trains are planned to either continue to Millennium Station at peak service hours or terminate here as short turns at other times, with transfers available on the main line platform.

References

Hammond, Indiana
South Shore Line stations in Indiana
Railway stations in Lake County, Indiana
Railway stations scheduled to open in 2025